Charles Matthews Pickerd (7 January 1892 – 9 October 1933) was an Australian rules footballer who played with St Kilda in the Victorian Football League (VFL).

Family
The son of Charles Martin Pickerd, and Annie Pickerd, née Bourne, Charles Matthews Pickerd was born at North Melbourne, Victoria on 7 January 1892.

He married Eileen May Winnacott (1889–1984) (later Mrs. Frederick Nicholas Jennings) on 22 March 1917.

Football

St Kilda (VFL)
He played in one match for the St Kilda First XVIII, against Geelong, on 20 August 1910, at the age of 18.

Narrandera Imperials (SWDFA)
He was the captain of the Narrandera Imperials Football Club, in New South Wales, in 1914 when it won the premiership of the South West Football League (New South Wales).

Death
He died at his Glen Huntly, Victoria residence on 9 October 1933.

Notes

References

External links 

1892 births
1933 deaths
Australian rules footballers from Melbourne
St Kilda Football Club players
Caulfield Football Club players
People from North Melbourne